Frank Newfeld FGDC is a book designer, illustrator, art director and educator.

Newfeld is arguably the greatest book designer of the 20th century in Canada. He has designed over 650 books and won more than 170 international awards. He is a former Vice-President of Publishing at McClelland & Stewart, Head of the Illustration Program at Sheridan College and Co-founder/President of the Society of Typographic Designers of Canada (now the Society of Graphic Designers of Canada - GDC).

He is a Fellow  of the Society of Graphic Designers of Canada, and a member of the Royal Canadian Academy. in 2015, Newfeld was appointed to the Order of Canada.

Newfeld has created three children’s books, two of them published by Oxford University Press and one by Groundwood Books (Douglas & McIntyre). In 2008 his book 'Drawing on Type' was published by Porcupine's Quill. He is also known for his great illustrations in the best selling children's book Alligator Pie.

See also

Alligator Pie

External links
GDC Fellows | 1990 Recipients
Drawing on Type at The Porcupine's Quill (publisher)
Drawing on Type at ISBNdb.com
Partial bibliography at ISBNdb.com
The work of Frank Newfeld
An Evening with Frank Newfeld

Canadian illustrators
Living people
Year of birth missing (living people)